The Birth of a Soul is a 1920 American silent drama film directed by Edwin L. Hollywood and written by Arthur Edwin Krows.  The film stars Harry T. Morey, Jean Paige, and Charles Eldridge.

Cast list

Production
The film was shot in the mountains of North Carolina.

References

1920 films
American silent feature films
American black-and-white films
1920 drama films
Films directed by Edwin L. Hollywood
Vitagraph Studios films
1920s English-language films
1920s American films